The Sioux Falls Storm are a professional indoor football team based in Sioux Falls, South Dakota. The Storm joined the original Indoor Football League as an expansion team in 1999 as the Sioux Falls Cobras, and first took the field for the 2000 season. They currently participate in another iteration of the Indoor Football League; prior to that, the Storm were in United Indoor Football (UIF), where they won all four of the league's championship games. In the newer IFL, the Storm have won seven of the eleven championships in the league as of 2019.

They play their home games at Denny Sanford Premier Center. In mid-April 2014, the team announced that the 2014 season would be its last at the aging Sioux Falls Arena (also known as the Storm Shelter), originally constructed in 1961. In 2015, the Storm followed the Sioux Falls Stampede of the United States Hockey League to the newly constructed Denny Sanford Premier Center.

History
The Storm were founded as an expansion team in the original Indoor Football League in 1999 as the Sioux Falls Cobras.  In their inaugural 2000 season, they won their first game defeating the Sioux City Attack 44–30.  They went 8–6 on the season and finished fourth in the Southern Division.  After one season, the became members of the National Indoor Football League (NIFL) and changed their name to the Storm.  The Storm hosted the 2004 NIFL championship game against the Lexington Horsemen in the Storm Shelter in front of a sellout crowd.  The Horsemen won the championship game, but the Storm defeated the Horsemen a year later in the second round of the 2005 UIF playoffs in Lexington.

The Sioux Falls Storm were charter members of United Indoor Football (UIF) in 2005 and were the first UIF champions with a win over the Sioux City Bandits, 40–38 at Sioux City.  Sioux Falls won its second consecutive UIF championship in 2006 at their home ground, the Arena, defeating the Lexington Horseman 72–64 on July 29, 2006. Quarterback Terrance Bryant was named United Bowl II MVP after throwing eight touchdowns in the match.  Defensive end Nate Fluit recorded 16.5 sacks in 2005 and 15.5 in 2006.

Sioux Falls became one of the few teams in indoor football history to post a shutout, beating the Peoria Rough Riders 71–0 on June 3, 2006.

On Saturday, August 4, 2007, the Storm defeated the Lexington Horsemen for the second United Bowl in a row, 62 to 59. With 19 seconds left to go in the game Storm quarterback Terrance Bryant threw up a prayer, and though protested by the small crowd of Horsemen fans, it was ruled a touchdown pass. With three seconds left in the game, and with the help of a frantic fan going for the game ball, the Horsemen gained 15 yards for a chance to kick a field goal and tie the game, but the kick was missed by Horsemen kicker Collin Barber.

On March 29, 2008, the Storm lost to the Omaha Beef 34–18, ending their historic 40-game winning streak and giving them their first loss since July 15, 2005. They went on to win their fourth United Bowl later that season against the Bloomington Extreme.

On April 25, 2009, after switching to the Indoor Football League, the Storm were found in violation of the IFL's rule of not complying with regulations related to workers compensation coverage.  As punishment, the team's first five wins of the 2009 season were forfeited; this resulted in a 6–8 season, the first losing season in team history.  The other three losses all came to the Billings Outlaws.  In 2010, the Storm rebounded to reach the United Bowl before losing 43–34 to the Outlaws.

After a tornado dubbed the Father's Day Tornado hit Billings' Rimrock Auto Arena on June 20, 2010, causing major damage, the Outlaws franchise folded, and their star quarterback Chris Dixon signed with the Storm. Led by Dixon, Sioux Falls scored an astounding 1022 points on the 2011 regular season, with 70 or more points in 10 games and opening with a 105–71 win over the Kent Predators in Kent, Washington. Only twice did the Storm fall short of 50 points and both were against the Omaha Beef, who handed them a 41–37 loss in the regular season finale after Sioux Falls had started 13–0. The two teams met in the next game, which was the playoff opener. The Storm won it, 52–39, then beat Green Bay 52–12 to return to the United Bowl. Although they tied their lowest scoring game of the season, Sioux Falls rolled over the Tri-Cities Fever 37–10 to earn the league championship after a two-year hiatus and also win its first IFL title.  Dixon and the Storm dominated again in 2012, this time with a perfect 14–0 record and 941 points in the regular season. On April 14, the Storm beat the Allen Wranglers, then featuring former NFL standout receiver Terrell Owens, 52–45 on the road in Allen, Texas. Dixon threw his 500th career touchdown pass, when he hit James Terry with a 42-yard pass during a May 19 game against the Blizzard. Sioux Falls defeated the Lehigh Valley Steelhawks 79–21 in the playoff opener, then again beat Green Bay in the semifinal and Tri-Cities (this time winning 59–32) in the United Bowl.

Dixon then left, attempting to make it with the Orlando Predators of the Arena Football League. Sioux Falls did not suffer greatly in 2013 as Storm legend Terrance Bryant returned to play quarterback. Following a 10–4 season, the Storm again prevailed in the playoffs and defeated the Nebraska Danger by a close 43–40 score for the title. Bryant then retired again, as on January 6, 2014, it was announced that Dixon would be returning to the Storm, citing his desire to graduate from Augustana College and be close to his family. Dixon did not disappoint, leading the Storm to their eighth title in 2014. The Storm again defeated Nebraska in the United Bowl by a 63–46 score. The Sioux Falls Storm completed its era at the Sioux Falls Arena with a 112–14 home record including 82-3 from 2006 to 2014.

In 2015, the Storm's first season at the Denny Sanford Premier Center was very successful, completing another undefeated season at 16-0 overall, and was capped off with winning their ninth league championship by a score of 62–27 over the Danger.

In 2016, the Storm continued their dominance.  But lost their first game since the 2014 season as they lost at the Cedar Rapids Titans, 60–57.  But despite that setback, they capped off another successful season with a win over the newly minted Spokane Empire, 55–34, to capture their tenth championship overall and their sixth IFL Championship and sixth in a row. They returned to the championship game in 2017, but lost for the first time since the 2010 season to the Arizona Rattlers.

Prior to the 2018 season, the Storm announced they would join Champions Indoor Football (CIF) on August 30, 2017, in order to have smaller travel budget and reignite rivalries with the nearby Sioux City Bandits and Omaha Beef. However, after the IFL's offseason meetings, the Storm re-joined the IFL on October 4.

Players

Current roster

Retired numbers

Awards and honors

Notable Sioux Falls alumni

Coaches

Head coaches

* Records do not reflect the five forfeits due to insurance violations in 2009.
Also see: List of professional gridiron football coaches with 200 wins

Staff

Season-by-season results

Records vs. opponent
 * win forfeited to a loss for insurance violation

Season schedules (2001–2018)

2001
2001 National Indoor Football League Season Summary

2002
2002 National Indoor Football League Season Summary

2003
2003 National Indoor Football League Season Summary

2004
2004 National Indoor Football League Season Summary

2005
2005 United Indoor Football Season Summary

2006
2006 United Indoor Football Season Summary

2007
2007 United Indoor Football Season Summary

2008
2008 United Indoor Football Season Summary

2009
2009 Indoor Football League Season Summary

 Forfeited due to insurance violation

2010–2018
2010 Sioux Falls Storm season
2011 Sioux Falls Storm season
2012 Sioux Falls Storm season
2013 Sioux Falls Storm season
2014 Sioux Falls Storm season
2015 Sioux Falls Storm season
2016 Sioux Falls Storm season
2017 Sioux Falls Storm season
2018 Sioux Falls Storm season

Team player records

Single season
As of the end of the 2022 season
Pass Attempts: Ryan Aulenbacher, 401 (2002 – 14 games)
Completions: Chris Dixon, 268 (2012 – 14 games)
Passing Yards: Chris Dixon, 3,321 (2012 – 14 games)
Passing Touchdowns: Chris Dixon, 74 (2011 – 14 games)
Carries: Sean Treasure, 201 (2009 – 14 games)
Rushing Yards: Sean Treasure, 812 (2009 – 14 games)
Rushing Touchdowns: Marques Smith, 32 (2007 – 15 games)
Receptions: James Terry, 94 (2010 – 14 games)
Receiving Yards: Carl Sims, 1,108 (2012 – 14 games)
Receiving Touchdowns: Clinton Solomon, 27 (2012 – 14 games)
Kick Return Yards: James Jones, 1,350 (2005 – 16 games)
Kick Return Touchdowns: Korey Williams, 5 (2016 – 16 games)
Missed Field Goal Return Yards: Shannon Poppinga, 237 (2008 – 14 games)
Missed Field Goal Return Touchdowns: Shannon Poppinga, 2 (2008 – 14 games)
Field Goal Percentage (Minimum: 20 Attempts): Miles Bergner, 64.7% (2018 – 14 games)
PAT Percentage (Minimum: 30 Attempts): Parker Douglass, 95.7% (2011 – 14 games)
Total Yards: James Jones, 2,198 (2005 – 16 games)
Total Touchdowns: Korey Williams, 34 (2016 – 16 games)
Field Goals: Parker Douglass, 27 (2013 – 14 games)
PATs: Parker Douglass, 134 (2011 – 14 games)
Total Points: Korey Williams, 204 (2016 – 16 games)
Tackles: Tyler Knight, 140.5 (2016 – 16 games)
Tackles for Loss: Brandon Peguese, 25.5 (2016 – 16 games)
Sacks: Nate Fluit, 18.0 (2006 – 15 games)
Interceptions: Shannon Poppinga, 10 (2005 – 16 games)
Pass Breakups: Bobby Perkins, 20 (2002 – 14 games)
Blocked Kicks: Nate Fluit, 10 (2006 – 15 games)

Career records
As of the end of the 2022 season and does not include the postseason
Pass Attempts: Terrance Bryant, 2,268
Completions: Terrance Bryant, 1,491
Passing Yards: Terrance Bryant, 15,011
Passing Touchdowns: Terrance Bryant, 280
Carries: Lorenzo Brown, 867
Rushing Yards: Lorenzo Brown, 3,582
Rushing Touchdowns: Lorenzo Brown, 128
Receptions: James Terry, 607	
Reception Yards: James Terry, 6,601
Reception Touchdowns: James Terry, 145
Total Yards: James Terry, 8,417
Field Goals: Adam Hicks, 131
FG % (Minimum: 20 Attempts): Miles Bergner, 66.0%
PATs: Parker Douglass, 584
PAT % (Minimum: 35 Attempts): Sawyer Petre, 90.1%
Kick Return Yards: James Jones, 2,469
Kick Return Touchdowns: Korey Williams, 9
Missed Field Goal Return Yards: Shannon Poppinga, 416
Missed Field Goal Return Touchdowns: Shannon Poppinga, 3
Total Touchdowns: James Terry, 166
Total Points: James Terry, 1,000
Tackles: Mark Blackburn, 715.5
Tackles for Loss: Rachman Crable, 73.0
Sacks: Cory Johnsen, 64.5
Interceptions: Shannon Poppinga, 46
Interception Touchdowns: Shannon Poppinga, 6
Pass Breakups: Shannon Poppinga, 109
Forced Fumbles: Rachman Crable/Cory Johnsen/Tyler Knight, 10
Blocked Kicks: Tyler Knight, 24

References

External links
 Official site
 Storm's 2001 stats
 Storm's 2002 stats
 Storm's 2003 stats
 Storm's 2004 stats
 Storm's 2005 stats
 Storm's 2006 stats
 Storm's 2007 stats
 Storm's 2008 stats
 Storm's 2009 stats

 
2000 establishments in South Dakota
Sports organizations established in 2000